Air Panamá Internacional (also known as simply just Air Panama) was a state owned airline from Panama that served as the flag carrier of the country between 1968 and 1989. From its hub at Tocumen International Airport in Panama City, scheduled passenger flights to a number of destinations in the Americas was offered.

History
Air Panamá Internacional was founded in 1967 as a joint venture between the Politics of Panama (67%) and Spanish airline Iberia (33%). When Iberia pulled out approximately ten years later, the airline became fully state-owned.
 
During the 1980s, when Panama was ruled by military dictator Manuel Noriega, the route network and aircraft fleet of Air Panamá went into decline because of the worsened financial and economic situation of the company, which led to Copa Airlines emerging as the largest airline of the country. All flight operations with Air Panamá Internacional ceased in December 1989 over the United States invasion of Panama. The only aircraft of the airline at that time, a leased Boeing 727. In January 1990, Air Panamá Internacional declared bankruptcy and ceased operations on December 2, 1990.

On July 11, 1991, there was an attempt by the Politics of Panama to relaunch the airline in summer of 1992 as Panama Air International, however this attempt failed. In 2005, Turismo Aéreo acquired the Air Panama branding and adopted its trademark rights.

Destinations

During the 1970s and early 1980s, Air Panamá Internacional offered scheduled flights to the following destinations:

Argentina
Buenos Aires - Ministro Pistarini International Airport
Colombia
Bogotá - El Dorado International Airport
Ecuador
Guayaquil - José Joaquín de Olmedo International Airport
Guatemala
Guatemala City - La Aurora International Airport
Mexico
Mexico City - Mexico City International Airport
Panama
Panama City - Tocumen International Airport Hub
Peru
Lima - Jorge Chávez International Airport
United States
Los Angeles - Los Angeles International Airport
Miami - Miami International Airport
New York City - John F. Kennedy International Airport
Venezuela
Caracas - Simón Bolívar International Airport

Fleet

Over the years, Air Panamá Internacional operated the following aircraft types:

In addition, two Boeing 757-200s were wet-leased from Venezuelan airline Avensa in 1992 as part of the relaunch as "Panama Air".

See also
List of defunct airlines of Panama

References

External links

Airlines established in 1967
Airlines disestablished in 1990
Defunct airlines of Panama
1968 establishments in Panama
Companies based in Panama City